San Secondo may refer to:

San Secondo, Città di Castello, a frazione of the comune of Città di Castello, Italy
San Secondo, Magnano, a church in the Province of Biella, Italy
San Secondo Parmense, a comune in the province of Parma, Italy
San Secondo di Pinerolo, a comune  in the province of Turin, Italy
Isola di San Secondo, a deserted island in the Venetian Lagoon, Italy

See also
 Secundus (disambiguation), the Latin name of several Catholic saints